Gerolamo Castaldi (died 1521) was a Roman Catholic prelate who served as Bishop of Massa Lubrense (1506–1521).

Biography
On 5 July 1506, Gerolamo Castaldi was appointed during the papacy of Pope Julius II as Bishop of Massa Lubrense.
He served as Bishop of Massa Lubrense until his death in 1521.

See also
Catholic Church in Italy

References

External links and additional sources
 (for Chronology of Bishops) 
 (for Chronology of Bishops) 

1521 deaths
16th-century Italian Roman Catholic bishops
Bishops appointed by Pope Julius II